Songs of Travel and Other Verses is an 1896 book of poetry by Robert Louis Stevenson. Originally published by Chatto & Windus,  it explores the author's perennial themes of travel and adventure. The work gained a new public and popularity when it was set to music in Songs of Travel by Ralph Vaughan Williams.

External links
 Songs of Travel at archive.org

References

1896 poetry books
Poetry by Robert Louis Stevenson
British poetry collections
Chatto & Windus books
Books published posthumously